The Women's sprint events in cross-country skiing at the 2011 IPC Biathlon and Cross-Country Skiing World Championships, were held on April 8, 2011.

Medals

Results

Sitting
The women's 0.9 km sprint, sitting. Skiers compete on a sitski.

Qualification

Semifinals
Semifinal 1

Semifinal 2

Finals

Final standings
The final standings of the women's 0.9 km sprint, sitting.

Standing
The women's 1 km sprint free, standing.

Qualification

Semifinals
Semifinal 1

Semifinal 2

Finals

Final standings
The final standings of the women's 1 km sprint free, standing.

Visually impaired
In the women's 1 km sprint free, visually impaired, skiers with a visual impairment compete with a sighted guide. Dual medals are rewarded.

Qualification

Semifinals
Semifinal 1

Semifinal 2

Finals

Final standings
The final standings of the women's 1 km sprint free, visually impaired.

See also
FIS Nordic World Ski Championships 2011 – Women's sprint

References

2011 IPC Biathlon and Cross-Country Skiing World Championships Live results, and schedule at ipclive.siwidata.com
WCH - Khanty Mansiysk - Results - Cross-Country Sprint, IPC Nordic Skiing

Sprint